Rellinars is a municipality in the province of Barcelona and autonomous community of Catalonia, Spain.

References

External links
 Government data pages 

Municipalities in Vallès Occidental